John Paul Hogan (August 7, 1919 – February 19, 2012) was an American research chemist. Along with Robert Banks, he discovered methods of producing polypropylene and high-density polyethylene.

Hogan was born in Lowes, Kentucky to Charles Franklin and Alma (Wyman) Hogan and earned B.S. degrees in both Chemistry and Physics at Murray State University of Kentucky in 1942. He taught at both the high school and college level before going to work in research at the Phillips Petroleum Company in 1944.

His work was primarily in the area of plastics and catalysts. In 1951, he invented crystalline polypropylene and high-density polyethylene (HDPE) with his fellow research chemist Robert Banks. These plastics were initially known by the name Marlex. He held (jointly) a number of important patents and authored research papers before he left Phillips in 1985.

After a few years as an independent consultant, he fully retired in 1993.

In 1987, he and Robert Banks together received the Perkin Medal Award and both were given a Heroes of Chemistry award by the American Chemical Society in 1989. In 2001, they were inducted into the National Inventors Hall of Fame. Dr. Hogan was inducted into the Plastics Hall of Fame in 2014.

References

1919 births
2012 deaths
American inventors
Murray State University alumni
People from Graves County, Kentucky
Polymer scientists and engineers